If My Friends Could See Me Now is the second album by Scottish singer Lena Zavaroni. It was released in 1974 on Philips Records and produced by Johnny Franz.

Track listing 
 "If My Friends Could See Me Now" (Cy Coleman, Dorothy Fields)
 "Kiss Me, Honey Honey, Kiss Me" (Al Timothy, Michael Julien)
 "The Tennessee Wig-Walk" (Norman Gimbel, Larry Coleman)
 "(The) Rock and Roll Waltz" (Roy Alfred, Shorty Allen)
 "What a Wonderful World" (George Douglas, George David Weiss)
 "Hands Off" (White, Sanderson)
 "It's in His Kiss" (Rudy Clark)
 "Music, Music, Music" (Stephen Weiss, Bernie Baum)
 "Tweedle Dee Dee, Tweedle Dee Dum" (Helen Cornelius)
 "Wheel of Fortune" (Bennie Benjamin, George David Weiss)
 "You're Never too Old to be Young" (John Franz, Bryan Blackburn)
 "Stage Struck" (Johnny Mercer, André Previn)

Personnel
 Lena Zavaroni – vocals

Additional personnel
Orchestra directed by Peter Knight
 Album produced by Tommy Scott for Ashtree Holdings Ltd.
 Production by John Franz

References

1974 albums
Lena Zavaroni albums
Albums conducted by Peter Knight (composer)
Albums produced by Johnny Franz
Philips Records albums